Music in the Blood (German: Musik im Blut) may refer to:

 Music in the Blood (1934 film), a German film directed by Erich Waschneck 
 Music in the Blood (1955 film), a West German film directed by Erik Ode